Martín Garatuza is a Mexican telenovela produced by Fernando Moret and Rosy Ocampo for Televisa in 1986. The plot is based on the life of Martín Garatuza, a Mexican trickster of the 17th century.

Manuel Landeta and Cecilia Toussaint starred as protagonists, Eduardo Capetillo and Cecilia Tijerina starred as co-protagonists, while Julieta Egurrola, Raquel Olmedo, Claudio Báez, Alonso Echánove, Surya MacGregor, Óscar Traven and Alberto Estrella starred as antagonists. Rita Guerrero and Mariana Levy starred as stellar performances.

Cast 
 Manuel Landeta as Martín Garatuza
 Mariana Levy as Beatriz de Rivera
 Eduardo Capetillo as Román Garatuza
 Julieta Egurrola as Bruja Sarmiento
 Claudio Báez as Pedro de Mejía
 Alonso Echánove as El Ahuizote
 Óscar Traven as Alonso de River
 Cecilia Toussaint as Antonio de Araujo
 Cecilia Tijerina as Lucía de Rivera
 Rafael Rojas as César de Villaclara
 Rita Guerrero as Blanca de Mejía
 Álvaro Cerviño as Fernando de Quesada
 Surya MacGregor as Luisa Pérez de Varaiz
 Alberto Estrella as Carlos de Arellano
 Héctor Álvarez as Guillén
 Raquel Olmedo as Princess of Eboli
 Lupita Sandoval as Andrea
 Antonio Serrano as Teodoro
 Leonor Llausás as Cleofas
 Maripaz García as Lucrecia
 Jaime Vega as Anselmo
 Fernanda Ruizos as Berenice
 Álvaro Guerrero as Santillana
 Javier Díaz Dueñas as Virrey
 Juan Carlos Bidault as Román Garatuza (child)

Awards

References

External links
 

1986 telenovelas
Mexican telenovelas
1986 Mexican television series debuts
1986 Mexican television series endings
Spanish-language telenovelas
Television shows set in Mexico
Television series set in the 17th century
Televisa telenovelas